Eduardo Rabossi (1930–2005) was an Argentine philosopher and human rights activist.

Biography 
Eduardo Rabossi was born in Buenos Aires on March 20, 1930 and graduated in Law at the University of Buenos Aires (UBA) in 1955. Afterwards, he obtained his M.A. on philosophy at Duke University. The UBA was intervened by the military government in 1966, so he resigned to his work as a teacher and worked in investigations at the Oxford university instead. 

He is credited as a pioneer of analytic philosophy in Argentina. He was one of the founders and president of SADAF, the Argentine Society of Analytic Philosophy and the editor of its journal, Análisis Filosófico. He created that organization alongside Genario Carrió, Gregorio Klimovsky and Carlos Alchourrón, after his return from the United Kingdom. 

He was designated by President Raúl Alfonsín member of the CONADEP, the national Commission to determine the fate of desaparecidos. The work was included in the Nunca más report. He was also appointed Undersecretary of Human Rights. He was also a member of APDH. He was called as a witness in the Trial of the Juntas, to explain his work for the CONADEP. He also helped Uruguay to clarify the fate of 130 Uruguayan died in Argentina during the Dirty War. 

He died in Cuzco, Perú on November 11, 2005, while participating in a professional congress.

Works 
 Filosofía de la mente y ciencia cognitiva, 1995
 La filosofía y el filosofar, 1994
 La carta universal de los derechos humanos, 1987
 Etica y análisis, 1985
 Philosophical Analysis in Latin America, 1982 (редактор)
 Estudios éticos, 1977
 Análisis filosófico, lenguaje y metafísica, 1977
 La justificación moral del castigo, 1976

Bibliography 
 Eduardo Rabossi: In Memoriam // Areté Revista de Filosofía Vol.  XVIII, N° 2, 2006

References

External links 
 Premio Konex — Currículum

1930 births
2005 deaths
People from Buenos Aires
Argentine people of Italian descent
Argentine philosophers
Duke University alumni
20th-century Argentine philosophers
Argentine human rights activists